Marsudi Wahyu Kisworo is an Indonesian Professor of Computer Science affiliated with Bina Darma University. On 13 October 2021, he appointed as Member of the Board of Governors of the National Research and Innovation Agency (BRIN) by Joko Widodo.

Early life and education 
Marsudi was born as son of Djoko Susilo, a teacher of Teacher Education School. Due to his father mobile assignment, he rarely stay long in one place and constantly moving from one town to another town. He enrolled to Department of Electrical Engineering, Bandung Institute of Technology (ITB) in 1978. He later took specialization of Computer System and Engineering during his study here and graduated in 1983. He was worked to a company, and later continuing his study to Curtin University of Technology thru AIDAB scholarship in 1989. He obtained his master's degree in computer science in 1990 and Ph.D. degree in computer science in 1992.

Rise to Prominence

First Indonesian IT Professor 
Marsudi was appointed as Professor in the field of Computer Science in 2002. At that time, he was the first Indonesian IT professor. He also advisor of future Vice Head of Corruption Eradication Commission, Bibit Samad Rianto.

Founder of Paramadina University 
Marsudi is one of founder of Paramadina University [id]. He together with Nurcholish Madjid, and friends from Islamic Network, an international Indonesian Islamic student majlis ta'lim, founded the university in 1998.

Role in 2019 Indonesian General Election 
Marsudi was hired by General Elections Commission (KPU) as system architect of KPU for the 2004 election. Together with experts at that time from University of Indonesia, Bandung Institute of Technology, Sepuluh Nopember Institute of Technology, and Paramadina University, he and others build the Election Information System used by KPU. Marsudi play significant role in clearing false allegation that General Elections Commission favoring Joko Widodo - Ma'ruf Amin during hearing at Constitutional Court by explaining clearly how the Election Information System work, not as alleged by Prabowo Subianto - Sandiaga Uno defense team.

Personal life 
Marsudi married to Taty Adiyanty in 1985. Their marriage resulted in 3 children.

Marsudi is avid fan of Kungfu and practicing Tai Chi.

Aside of his hard skills, he also interested in self-development skills and mastered some of them, including Dale Carnegie method, Stephen Covey method, Anthony Robbins method, Neuro-linguistic programming, to even esoteric practices such as Reiki, Prana, Emotional Freedom Techniques, Hypnotism, and Spiritual intelligence. He also a well trained and seasoned speaker and motivator and possessed several international certification for those skills.

References 

Living people
1958 births
Indonesian academics
Indonesian businesspeople
Bandung Institute of Technology alumni
Curtin University alumni